Cherokee is an unincorporated community in Cherokee County, Kansas, United States.

History
A post office was opened in Cokedale in 1899, and remained in operation until it was discontinued in 1906.

References

Further reading

External links
 Cherokee County maps: Current, Historic, KDOT

Unincorporated communities in Cherokee County, Kansas
Unincorporated communities in Kansas